Randy de Puniet (born 14 February 1981) is a road racer of motorcycles from France. He competed in Grands Prix racing between 1998 and 2014, where he achieved five wins in the 250cc class. He also competed in the Superbike World Championship during the 2015 season with little success. He currently competes in the MotoE World Cup, aboard an Energica Ego Corsa.

Career
Born in Maisons-Laffitte, Yvelines, de Puniet was French 125cc champion in 1998, moving up to the world championship a year later. In  he moved up to the 250cc World Championship. He took his first win in Catalunya, coming 4th overall with 3 wins. In  he was third with a single win, spending  with on an Aprilia run by former world champion, Jorge Martínez and his Aspar Team.

He took his first front-row start at the 2007 Catalan Grand Prix, and finished a career-best fifth. Up until Donington, he started all but one other race on the third row. He started fourth and finished second at Motegi in the wet.

LCR Honda announced on 24 August 2007 that de Puniet would ride for them in 2008 and 2009. He ultimately remained with LCR for 2010, despite being linked to the French Tech 3 squad. He had been in contention for a Tech 3 ride for 2011, but team boss Herve Poncharal denied this link.

He enjoyed a strong run of form midseason in 2010, including consecutive front row starts at Silverstone and Assen. He was running fifth in the championship before breaking his leg in a crash at the Sachsenring. He missed the race at Laguna Seca before returning at Brno, where he finished tenth.

For 2014, De Puniet was not racing, instead concentrating on development and testing on the Suzuki 2015 MotoGP machine. He hoped to receive a wild card ride during 2014, and did so at the final race in Valencia, retiring from the race.

In 2021, De Puniet competed in the FIM Endurance World Championship with Moto Ain.

Career statistics

Grand Prix motorcycle racing

By season

By class

Races by year
(key) (Races in bold indicate pole position, races in italics indicate fastest lap)

Superbike World Championship

Races by year
(key) (Races in bold indicate pole position, races in italics indicate fastest lap)

Commitment
De Puniet is a member of the 'Champions for Peace' club, a group of more than 90 famous elite created by Peace and Sport, a Monaco-based international organization placed under the High Patronage of H.S.H Prince Albert II.

References

External links

 

1981 births
Living people
People from Maisons-Laffitte
Kawasaki Motors Racing MotoGP riders
125cc World Championship riders
250cc World Championship riders
French motorcycle racers
Superbike World Championship riders
Suzuki MotoGP riders
Pramac Racing MotoGP riders
Aspar Racing Team MotoGP riders
LCR Team MotoGP riders
Sportspeople from Yvelines
MotoGP World Championship riders
MotoE World Cup riders